The Macedonian cubit was a unit of measurement in use in ancient Macedonia. It was approximately 14 inches long, making it somewhat shorter than other cubit measurements used in the ancient world.

See also
Ancient weights and measures
Cubit

Obsolete units of measurement
Human-based units of measurement